The Aeris Naviter AN-2 Enara (Basque for 'Swallow') is a Spanish helicopter that was under development by Aeris Naviter of San Sebastián. The AN-2 was first shown at the 2009 Paris Air Show at Paris–Le Bourget Airport. The aircraft was intended to be supplied as a kit for amateur construction or as a complete ready-to-fly-aircraft.

The AN-2 was intended to have certification completed in the European Aviation Safety Agency Very Light Rotorcraft category by May 2010, and then again by the end of 2012 but, by January 2013, this does not seem to have been completed. Kits were intended to be ready for delivery in February 2010, but were not yet available as of January 2013. By late in 2011 there was no indication that the prototype had been flown.

By 2012 the company website was redirected to Cicare Europe and all mention of the AN-2 had been removed. It is likely development had ended by that point.

Design and development
The AN-2 Enara features a two-rotor coaxial main rotor, a two-seats-in tandem enclosed cockpit, tricycle landing gear with suspension, an H-tail and a four-cylinder, four-stroke,  BMW automotive engine. Plans for other powerplants include the four cylinder, air-cooled, four-stroke, dual-ignition  Lycoming IO-233 light-sport aircraft engine.

The aircraft fuselage is made from aluminum sheet.

Specifications (AN-2 Enara)

References

External links
Official website archives on Archive.org
Photo of the AN-2 Enara on Airliners.net

2000s Spanish sport aircraft
2000s Spanish helicopters
Homebuilt aircraft
Single-engined piston helicopters